The Bazin River is a river in Quebec, Canada, that flows from the La Tuque area of the La Tuque administrative authority of Mauricie to the Gatineau River in the unorganized territory of Lac-Oscar, in the regional county municipality of Antoine-Labelle, in Laurentides.

Geography 
This lake of  has three zones. The mouth of the lake is located southeast of the southern zone. The river runs south across a marsh zone to the north shore of Raoul Lake, where the current flows through . From there, the river flows west to meet the Marte River (coming from the north). Then the Bazin River branches off to the south, collecting Pitchpine Brook (coming from the west).

On its route, the river expands to include the lakes Raoul and Du-Tremblay. Then, it turns west near (north) of Parent. Then the route reorients itself to the south, then to the southwest.

Toponymy
The Bazin River flows through the canton of Bazin. This toponym evokes the memory of the French writer René Bazin (1853–1932). In the spring of 1912, Bazin arrived in Quebec as part of the Champlain Mission. He continued his stay in Quebec for the participation in the first congress of the French language in Canada which took place in June 1912. Bazin discovers the architectural beauty of Quebec City, overlooking "The most beautiful water crossroads of the world." The writer pays tribute to the rural population of the province.

As early as 1884, Bazin had treated Canada in his novel Aunt Giron. In 1910, in a book called La Douce France, Bazin tries to excite the nationalist fiber of young French people. His work was widely read in Canada-French, especially in the classical colleges of the time.

The name "Bazin River" has been on map documents since 1929. Previously, the river was known as the "Gatineau North East River" (1908) or simply "Gatineau River" (1914).

See also

Notes and references 

Rivers of Laurentides
Rivers of Mauricie
Antoine-Labelle Regional County Municipality
La Tuque, Quebec